Ek Rishtaa: The Bond of Love ( A Relationship: The Bond of Love) is a 2001 Indian Hindi-language drama film directed by Suneel Darshan released on 18 May 2001. The film stars Amitabh Bachchan, Akshay Kumar, Rakhee Gulzar, Juhi Chawla, Karishma Kapoor, Mohnish Bahl. It was the first film where Bachchan and Kumar worked together. The film is a family drama where a big family encounters a crisis when disputes take place between the father (Bachchan) and the son (Kumar).

Plot
Vijay Kapoor, a successful businessman lives happily with his wife and four children. His only son, Ajay, who was studying abroad and has graduated from university, comes back home now. Rajesh Purohit enters the family, and deviously impresses Vijay and his eldest daughter Priti, whereas his main goal is to impoverish their family and take over Vijay's fortune. Soon, Vijay approves their marriage. Meanwhile, Ajay falls in love with Nisha Thapar.

Vijay convinces him to first gain experience in the family business. However, ideological differences result in disputes between them. Ajay consequently stands firm in his decision to start his own business. Later, he takes out a loan for this. Furious, Vijay throws him out. Ajay marries and moves with Nisha into their new house. Rajesh makes Vijay sign a power of attorney empowering him, and is forced to pay the court a huge sum, to which he is unable. Thus, he goes bankrupt, and all his fortune goes to Rajesh.

As Ajay finds out what happened, Ajay learns Rajesh incited arguments between him and Vijay. He tries to get close to Vijay again, causing a crisis in his marriage with Nisha, who isn't pleased with Ajay's reunion with his family. They get separated due to consistent arguments between them. She finds out she is pregnant, and Ajay returns home. Now, his mission is to return his family fortune and Vijay's faith, as the latter still cannot forgive him. Eventually, Ajay and Vijay unite, although he is yet to return the fortune. 

Rajesh begins treating Priti badly, who also returns home. To make matters worse, Ajay learns that Vijay's old friend, Brij, also has turned his back on the latter, and having disassociated with him. To return his family fortune violently, Ajay forces Rajesh to sign another power of attorney which says the money comes back to the owner. With that, Vijay is able to settle the court payments. Priti tells Rajesh that she can never forgive him for the atrocities he inflicted on her family and orders him to leave for good. Nisha and Ajay unite, and the family finally comes together and lives happily as it used to be before.

Cast

Amitabh Bachchan as Vijay Kapoor
Raakhee as Pratima Kapoor
Akshay Kumar as Ajay Kapoor
Juhi Chawla as Priti Kapoor Purohit
Karishma Kapoor as Nisha Thapar Kapoor
Mohnish Behl as Rajesh Purohit
Simone Singh as Priya Kapoor
Alok Nath as Jagmohan Thapar
Shakti Kapoor as Ladoo
Ashish Vidyarthi as Hari Singh
Sharat Saxena as Police Inspector Swarnvijay Shergill
Avtar Gill as Vivek Khanna
Anang Desai as Brijbhan "Brij" Singh
Kunika as Sweety Aunty
Suniel Shetty as himself (special appearance)
Vrajesh Hirjee as Ramesh, the stall owner.
Nagma as herself in the song "Mulakat" (special appearance)

Soundtrack

The music was composed by Nadeem-Shravan while lyrics were by Sameer. The album was the tenth most sold album of 2001. Manish Dhamija from Planet Bollywood gave 7.5 stars stating,

Release

Critical reception
Dharmesh Rajput of BBCi-Films gave it 3.5 out of 5 stars, praising the performance of Amitabh Bachchan stating, "the real pleasure of this film is Amitabh's performance — is it any wonder he was voted best actor at the BBC Online Millennium Polls? This man is good value for money on the big screen". N.K Deoshi of Apunkachoice.com also gave the film 3.5 out of 5 stars but said "Suneel Darshan had all the ingredients to make a blockbuster, a celluloid virtuoso like Big B, a bevy of willowy beauties Karisma, Juhi and Simone Singh and, last but not the least, the khiladi Akshay Kumar. But despite such an impressive ensemble Ek Rishta turns out to be quite a disappointing fare". Savera R Someshwar of Rediff.com gave the a negative review calling the screenplay terrible but praised the performances of Amitabh, Akshay, Karishma, Rakhee Gulzar, Juhi Chawla and Mohnish Behl.

Box office
It was the seventh highest-grossing Hindi film of 2001.

Home media
Ek Rishtaa was released on DVD on 6 August 2001 across all regions in an NTSC-format single disc by Tip Top Video. A high-definition DVD version, with audio and video digitally restored, was later released by Shemaroo Entertainment. Even after Ek Rishtaas box office success, as he had with his previous works, Darshan refused to sell the film's television rights. The collective value of his films' unsold satellite rights was estimated to be 150 crore. Darshan finally sold the rights to his films to Zee in 2017, and Ek Rishtaa premiered on Zee Cinema on 16 September 2017, 16 years after its theatrical release. The film's premier garnered high ratings for the network.

References

External links

2001 drama films
2001 films
2000s Hindi-language films
Films scored by Nadeem–Shravan
Indian drama films
Indian family films
Films with screenplays by Robin Bhatt
Films directed by Suneel Darshan
Hindi-language drama films